Amy Head (born 1976) is a New Zealand writer.

Biography 
Head was born in Papakura, Auckland in 1976. She studied at the University of Canterbury, graduating with a Bachelor of Arts; she then completed a Master of Arts with Distinction in creative writing from Victoria University, Wellington.

Head's short story collection, Tough (VUP, 2014), was awarded the New Zealand Society of Authors’ Hubert Church Best First Book Award for Fiction.

References

1976 births
Living people
University of Canterbury alumni
Victoria University of Wellington alumni
21st-century New Zealand writers